The Metropolitan Area Express (MAX) is a light rail system serving the Portland metropolitan area in the U.S. state of Oregon. Owned and operated by TriMet, it consists of five color-designated lines that altogether connect the six sections of Portland; the communities of Beaverton, Clackamas, Gresham, Hillsboro, Milwaukie, and Oak Grove; and Portland International Airport to Portland City Center. Service runs seven days a week with headways of between 30 minutes off-peak and three minutes during rush hours. In 2019, MAX had an average daily ridership of 120,900, or 38.8 million annually. Due to the COVID-19 pandemic, which impacted public transit use globally, annual ridership plummeted, with only 14.8 million riders recorded in 2021.

MAX was among the first second-generation American light rail systems to be built, conceived from freeway revolts that took place in Portland in the early 1970s. Planning for the network's inaugural eastside segment, then referred to as the Banfield Light Rail Project, began in the mid-1970s following a study of mass transit alternatives using funds diverted from the canceled Mount Hood Freeway and Interstate 505 (I-505) projects. Construction began in 1982, and service commenced between downtown Portland and Gresham on September 5, 1986. The original 27-station,  line has since been expanded to a 94-station,  network, with the latest extension completed in 2015.

MAX is one of three urban rail transit services operating in the Portland metropolitan area, the other two being the Portland Streetcar and WES Commuter Rail. It provides direct connections to these rail services as well as to other modes of public transportation, including local and intercity buses at most stations and Amtrak at Portland Union Station. Trains operate at a maximum of two-car consists due to downtown Portland's short city blocks, and vehicles and platforms are fully accessible. Fares are collected through the Hop Fastpass payment system.

History

Predecessors

In the early 20th century, privately funded interurbans and streetcars gave the Portland metropolitan area one of the largest urban rail systems in the American West, with lines that once extended from Forest Grove to Troutdale and Vancouver, Washington to Eugene. Ben Holladay brought over Portland's first trolleys from San Francisco in 1872; they were drawn by horses and mules. In 1890, the first electric streetcar opened in Albina while the first cable car began running along 5th Avenue in Portland; these lines marked the start of an era of major streetcar line expansion. In 1892, the East Side Railway Company opened the first long-distance interurban line—a  route from Portland to Oregon City. The Portland Railway, Light and Power Company took over all local streetcars by 1906, and interurbans by 1908. In 1912, as Portland's population exceeded 250,000, transit ridership rose to 70 million passengers annually. Passenger rail services had started to decline by the 1920s with the rise of the automobile and suburban and freeway development. Portland's original streetcar lines ceased operating in 1950, replaced by buses until 2001, when the modern Portland Streetcar began running. Meanwhile, the region's last two interurban lines, which went to Oregon City and Bellrose (Southeast 136th Avenue), permanently closed in 1958.

Early beginnings

At the height of local freeway revolts in the 1970s, studies for public transit began using funds made available by the Federal-Aid Highway Act of 1973. These funds had been intended for the Mount Hood Freeway and I-505 projects, which were abandoned amid strong opposition from the Portland city government and neighborhood associations. In 1973, Governor Tom McCall assembled a task force that helped determine several alternative options, including a busway and light rail. Local jurisdictions originally favored the busway alternative but support for light rail prevailed following the mode's inclusion in a 1977 environmental impact statement. The proposal became known as the Banfield light rail project, named for the Banfield Freeway, a segment of I-84 that part of the alignment followed. TriMet approved the project in September 1978. Inaugural service commenced on September 5, 1986. Less than two months before opening, TriMet adopted the name "Metropolitan Area Express", or "MAX", following an employee contest.

As the planning of a light rail line to the west side gained momentum in the mid-1980s, the original MAX line came to be referred to as the Eastside MAX to distinguish it from what would become the Westside MAX extension. Early proposals called for the extension to terminate just west of the Beaverton–Hillsboro boundary on 185th Avenue in Washington County. A dispute between TriMet and the Urban Mass Transportation Administration over a financing plan suspended the project for several years but planning resumed in 1988 and studies were completed in 1991. Staunch lobbying by local and state officials led by Hillsboro Mayor Shirley Huffman forced an extension of the line further west to downtown Hillsboro in 1993. Construction of the 20-station,  line began that August with the excavation of the Robertson Tunnel. The Westside MAX opened in two stages following delays in tunneling: the section from 11th Avenue to Kings Hill/Southwest Salmon Street was opened in 1997 and the section to Hatfield Government Center—the segment's current western terminus—was opened in 1998. The resulting  MAX line began operating as a single, through service on September 12, 1998. This service was renamed the Blue Line in 2001 after TriMet adopted color designations for its light rail routes.

South/North plan

At the same time TriMet was planning the Westside MAX in the mid-1980s, Metro regional government announced new light rail proposals for Clackamas County. Its planning committee—the Joint Policy Advisory Committee on Transportation (JPACT)—proposed two separate routes that would have run between downtown Portland and Oregon City via Milwaukie and between Portland International Airport and Clackamas Town Center via I-205. Further planning led JPACT to favor the I-205 corridor due to an existing right-of-way along the I-205 Transitway, an unfinished mass transit component of the freeway that had been built to accommodate a busway. TriMet, however, prioritized the Westside MAX during its bid for federal matching funds and the I-205 plans were put on hold. In 1989, studies for both I-205 and Milwaukie proposals received funding from the U.S. Senate Committee on Appropriations under the condition that they included potential route extensions to Clark County, Washington. Metro completed the studies in 1993, ultimately abandoning I-205 in favor of a route along the I-5 and Willamette River corridors. It finalized a single  line from Hazel Dell, Washington south to Clackamas Town Center via Milwaukie, which Metro and TriMet formally named the South–North Line. Metro said it adopted the name "South/North" instead of the more conventional "North/South" word order, at the request of representatives in the southern part of the corridor after the southern leg, which had long been planned to be the next-priority MAX corridor after the Westside line, was merged with the northern leg as a single proposed project.

In November 1994, 63% of Portland area voters passed a $475million ballot measure to fund Oregon's portion of the project. The following February, however, Clark County residents defeated a tax measure that would have funded Washington's share. To move the project forward, TriMet downsized the plan and abandoned the line's Clark County and North Portland segments up to the Rose Quarter. That July, the Oregon House of Representatives approved a $750million transportation package, which included $375 million for the scaled-back line. The funding was annulled by the Oregon Supreme Court due to the inclusion of unrelated measures that violated the state's constitution. The legislature met again in February 1996 and passed a revised $375million package, but light rail opponents forced a statewide vote and defeated it the following November. A third proposal between Lombard Street in North Portland and Clackamas Town Center followed. This time, Metro and TriMet pursued the project without seeking contributions from either Clark County or the state, instead sourcing funds from Clackamas County and Portland. In 1998, TriMet placed a new ballot measure to reaffirm voter support for the $475million originally approved in 1994. The measure failed by 52% in November of that year, effectively canceling the proposed line.

Airport and Interstate lines

Compelled by the rapid expansion of Portland International Airport in the 1990s, the Port of Portland began exploring ways to alleviate worsening traffic congestion, including the possibility of introducing MAX service, which regional planners had not anticipated for at least another 20 years. A public–private partnership between the company and local governments was negotiated and construction of the Airport MAX began in June 1999. With no federal assistance requested and right-of-way already secured, it was completed in just under two years. The four-station,  line between Gateway/Northeast 99th Avenue Transit Center and Portland International Airport station opened on September 10, 2001. Celebrations scheduled for that weekend were canceled in the aftermath of the September 11 attacks. Red Line service originally ran between the airport and downtown, turning around at the loop tracks on 11th Avenue. On September 1, 2003, it was extended west along existing tracks to Beaverton Transit Center to relieve overcrowding on the Blue Line and to create a one-seat airport connection for the west side.

In 1999, Portland business leaders and residents who were opposed to the cancellation of the South–North Line urged TriMet to revive the project. TriMet responded with a new proposal that would expand MAX solely to North Portland via North Interstate Avenue. The agency moved forward with this plan and the Interstate MAX broke ground in February 2001. To minimize costs to taxpayers, the city created an urban renewal district and federal matching funds were allocated from the Airport MAX and Portland Streetcar projects, since these projects were locally funded. The 10-station,  extension from the Rose Quarter to the Expo Center opened on May 1, 2004, with its new service designated the Yellow Line. From 2004 to 2009, the Yellow Line ran from Expo Center station in North Portland to 11th Avenue in downtown Portland, following the Blue and Red lines' downtown alignment from the Steel Bridge. On August 30, 2009, it was rerouted to terminate at the PSU Urban Center stations with the addition of light rail to the Portland Transit Mall. In September 2012, this was extended further south to the PSU South stations, which had not been built due to the construction of nearby transit-oriented development. The Yellow Line became interlined with the Orange Line in 2015; it now only operates the northbound segment of the transit mall.

South Corridor extensions

In 2001, Metro revisited its former light rail plans for Clackamas County by reconsidering proposals similar to those of the canceled South–North Line project, with two routes extending to Clackamas and Milwaukie. This resulted in a new study, which Metro referred to as the South Corridor transportation project, that evaluated light rail among other alternatives. The study's task force recommend both light rail options in 2003 and suggested splitting the project into two phases. The first phase planned for the addition of light rail to I-205, between Gateway Transit Center and Clackamas Town Center. In October of that year, the first phase plans were amended to include adding light rail to the Portland Transit Mall following a petition from Portland business leaders. The combined project was approved for federal funding in 2006 and work began in January 2007. Light rail commenced service along the 14-station,  Portland Transit Mall on August 30, 2009, first served by the Yellow Line. The opening of the eight-station,  I-205 MAX and Green Line service followed on September 12.

The South Corridor project's second phase initially proposed the extension of MAX between downtown Portland and Milwaukie via the Hawthorne Bridge. Studies showed that this alignment would cause severe traffic bottlenecks in downtown. As a result, Portland businesses pushed for the construction of a new bridge further upstream that led to the southern end of the Portland Transit Mall. The locally preferred alignment was finalized in mid-2008; a new bridge would carry light rail across the Willamette River from the South Waterfront to just south of the Oregon Museum of Science and Industry (OMSI). TriMet designed this bridge, which was eventually inaugurated as Tilikum Crossing, to be "car-free" and to accommodate only transit vehicles, bicycles, and pedestrians. Construction of the line began in June 2011. In September 2012, opponents passed a ballot initiative—with 60% of the vote—requiring all Clackamas County spending on light rail to be approved by voters. Following the county's attempt to end its involvement and a suit filed by TriMet, a circuit court upheld the project's continuation. The 17-station,  Portland–Milwaukie segment and Orange Line service opened on September 12, 2015. The Orange Line, operating along the Portland Transit Mall's southbound segment, became the third service to serve this corridor.

Future plans

TriMet works with local jurisdictions and agencies to identify and recommend priority transit projects to include in Metro's Regional Transportation Plan (RTP). The 2018 RTP is Metro's latest iteration, and it lists three funding scenarios that divide the region's proposals into three priority levels. The highest priority projects, which are referred to as "2027 Constrained", are proposals the region expects to have funding for by 2027. The "2040 Constrained" lists projects that fit within the region's planned budget through 2040, while the "2040 Strategic" are projects that may be built if additional funding becomes available.

Current projects

The 2018 RTP lists two MAX-related projects it expects will be funded by 2027; these are the "A Better Red" and Southwest Corridor projects.

Other proposals

TriMet has indicated that other extensions and improvements have been studied or discussed with Metro and cities in the region. These proposals include the following, with light rail and alternatives being considered:

 Extension to Forest Grove
 Extension to Oregon City via McLoughlin Boulevard (OR 99E)
 Extension to Bridgeport Village via I-205
 Extension to Hillsboro via Sunset Highway (US 26)
 Extension to Vancouver, Washington

Infrastructure

Lines

For MAX, a "line" refers to the physical railroad tracks and stations a train serves within its designated termini, i.e. a train "route" or "service". MAX consists of five of these lines, each assigned a color. The use of colors to distinguish the separately operated routes was adopted in 2000 and brought into use in 2001 with the start of Red Line service.

All five lines traverse downtown Portland. Within downtown, the Blue and Red lines run north–south via First Avenue and east–west via Morrison and Yamhill streets. The Green, Orange, and Yellow lines run north–south via the Portland Transit Mall on 5th and 6th avenues. The Yellow Line, which began service in 2004, originally followed the same route into downtown as the Blue and Red lines. It was realigned to the transit mall in 2009 when light rail service was introduced to that corridor. In 2015, the Orange Line took over the Yellow Line's southbound services on the transit mall.

All services except the Orange Line cross the Steel Bridge and serve the Rose Quarter. The Orange Line is the only service that travels across Tilikum Crossing, and the Green Line is the only service that shares parts of its route with all of the other lines.

Segments

It was built in a series of six projects starting with the Banfield—now Eastside—alignment. A portion of the Eastside MAX between 11th Avenue and Gateway Transit Center is now served by the Blue, Green, and Red lines. A section of the Westside MAX between Beaverton Transit Center and 11th Avenue is served by the Blue and Red lines. The Green, Orange, and Yellow lines share the segment that was built as part of the Portland Transit Mall light rail project. The four remaining segments, all of which are located outside the city center, are operated by one service, often making the service and segment synonymous (e.g. Red Line and Airport MAX).

Alignment

In parts of the MAX network, particularly in downtown Portland and downtown Hillsboro, trains run on surface streets, where they operate in reserved lanes closed to other motorized vehicles. Exceptions include street intersections, the Portland Transit Mall, Southwest Harbor Viaduct, and Tilikum Crossing, where transit buses and streetcars utilize the same lanes but with MAX assigned traffic priority.

Elsewhere, MAX runs within its own exclusive right-of-way; this includes street medians, former railroad lines, alongside freeways and existing freight lines, viaducts, and underground. Where the tracks run within a street median, intersections are controlled by traffic signals that give trains preemption. Where tracks run on a separate right-of-way, trains are protected by automated grade crossing gates when traversing level crossings. Some segments of MAX are elevated to carry trains over busy thoroughfares and difficult terrain. A  section of tracks runs beneath Washington Park in Portland's West Hills through the Robertson Tunnel, the system's longest underground segment.

MAX crosses the Willamette River using the Steel Bridge and Tilikum Crossing. In studies conducted for the Eastside MAX, planners recommended using the Steel Bridge due to its former role as a river crossing for the city's historic streetcars. When MAX commenced service in 1986, trains shared the bridge's center lanes with vehicular traffic. In 2008, workers closed the bridge's upper deck to construct a junction between the Eastside MAX tracks and the newer Portland Transit Mall tracks. Upon reopening, the two inner lanes became exclusive to MAX trains, while cars, buses, and other motorized traffic were restricted to the two outer lanes. TriMet designed and built the newer Tilikum Crossing to accommodate transit vehicles (MAX, streetcar, and buses), cyclists, and pedestrians only; with the exception of emergency responders, private vehicles are prohibited. Tilikum Crossing is thus recognized as the first major "car-free" bridge in the United States.

Power and signaling

MAX is powered by a conventional 750-volt direct current (DC) overhead wire system. Most of the system uses a dual-wire catenary, with a contact wire supported by a messenger wire. In central city areas such as downtown Portland, MAX uses a single contact wire to minimize the amount of overhead wiring. To further minimize its visual impact, ornamental street light poles, buildings, and bridge structures are used to support overhead wiring in lieu of additional poles. The power system can bridge any one substation so that trains can continue to operate should a substation or its supply go down.

Approximately 70 percent of the MAX system uses automatic block signaling (ABS), which allows for relatively fast operating speeds—up to —and short headways. For example, between Lloyd Center/Northeast 11th Avenue station and Gateway Transit Center along the Banfield Freeway—where Blue, Green, and Red lines interline—ABS can accommodate an operating headway of two minutes. Within these sections, automatic train stops (ATS) enforce speed limits and automatically apply the brakes should a train operator fail to do so. The remaining 30 percent of the system, which runs within city street medians, relies on traffic signals and line-of-sight operation. Speeds do not exceed  in these sections.

Stations

The MAX system consists of 94 stations, of which 48 are served by the Blue Line, 30 by the Green Line, 26 by the Red Line, 17 by the Orange Line, and 17 by the Yellow Line. Of these, 32 stations are served by at least two lines and eight stations are served by three lines. The system's central stations, where all MAX services interconnect, are situated within two city blocks in downtown Portland occupied by the Pioneer Courthouse and Pioneer Courthouse Square. They are the Pioneer Courthouse and Pioneer Place stations—served by the Green, Orange, and Yellow lines—and the Pioneer Square stations—served by the Blue and Red lines.

MAX stations vary in size but are generally simple and austere. Like other North American light rail systems, MAX stations do not have faregates; paid fare zones are delineated but remain accessible to anyone. In 2015, TriMet proposed installing turnstiles at some stations along the Portland–Milwaukie segment but never did so. Stations are typically equipped with trash cans, shelters, and ticket vending machines. Most stations have arrival information displays that show when trains arrive and other service information. These displays were first installed at I-205 and Portland Transit Mall stations, and a federal grant in 2013 enabled TriMet to add more at other locations. Concessionaires sometimes open coffee shops at certain stations.

A majority of MAX stations are at street level, correlating to the system's predominant alignment. Sunset Transit Center, and stations along the Banfield Freeway are below street level. One station, is elevated.

Many MAX stations facilitate transfers to other modes of public transit. 11 stations are transit centers with connections to multiple local and intercity bus routes. Beaverton Transit Center is the only MAX-served transit center with a transfer to the region's commuter rail line, WES Commuter Rail, which operates between Beaverton and Wilsonville in Washington County. Within the Portland Transit Mall, trains connect with buses serving downtown Portland; bus stops take up transit mall blocks unoccupied by light rail platforms. MAX riders can transfer to the Portland Streetcar at points where MAX and streetcar lines intersect and to Amtrak via two stations near Portland Union Station. The Red Line operates as an airport rail link with a stop at a MAX station attached to the main passenger terminal of Portland International Airport.

TriMet has built a total of six infill stations. On March 1, 2020, TriMet permanently closed the Mall infill stations in an effort to speed up travel times in downtown Portland. The agency also temporarily closed Kings Hill/Southwest Salmon Street station for a trial period ending on March 1, 2021.

Accessibility

Stations built as part of the Banfield Light Rail Project were originally fitted with electric wayside lifts to accommodate riders with mobility devices on the system's high-floor, first-generation vehicles. Each station had two lifts, one for each direction of travel. The lifts were installed on platforms rather than on trains to prevent malfunctions from delaying service. Increased use of the lifts eventually became the cause of delays, and many users felt stigmatized by the lifts' "box" design and time-consuming operation. With the passing into law of the Americans with Disabilities Act (ADA), TriMet developed a paratransit plan in January 1992. Just before the start of the Westside MAX Project, MAX became the first light rail system in North America to procure low-floor vehicles after a TriMet study of European systems. The low-floor cars, which TriMet and Siemens jointly developed, entered service in August 1997.

MAX achieved full accessibility in April 1999. Ticket vending machines provide information and instructions in audio, braille, and raised lettering. Station platforms also have signs with braille and raised lettering to indicate which lines provide service and where they go. The edge of platforms have tactile paving to warn riders from standing too close to the edge. Non-street-level platforms may be accessed with elevators. Most light rail cars, with the exception of Type 1, are low-floor and have ramps that extend onto platforms to allow mobility devices to board. High-floor Type 1 cars are paired with low-floor Type 2 or 3 cars to maintain accessibility. In each train, an audio system and LED signs announce the name of each upcoming station. All trains have spaces and priority seating areas reserved for seniors and people with disabilities, and service animals are permitted on board.

In 2011, TriMet began upgrading the oldest sections of MAX to improve pedestrian safety and compliance with updated ADA standards. TriMet installed pipe barriers at Gateway Transit Center platform crossings to force pedestrians to slow down and face oncoming trains before crossing the tracks and realigned sidewalks and crosswalks at four at-grade crossings in Gresham. Other improvements made throughout the line include the installation of pedestrian warning signals and tactile paving upgrades.

Parking

Based on a report published in 2019, TriMet provides a total of 12,614 park-and-ride spaces, of which 10,219 directly serve 25 MAX stations. The agency's parking facilities are either surface lots or multi-level garages, and they are free to use. TriMet allows vehicles to park at most stalls overnight as long as they do not remain for more than 24 hours. At some locations, TriMet negotiates with nearby establishments for additional parking spaces. Westside MAX stations contain 3,643 parking spaces, the most number of spaces in a corridor. Clackamas Town Center Transit Center on the I-205 MAX segment includes a 750-space parking garage, the largest capacity of any single MAX station. Southeast Holgate Boulevard station, also on the I-205 MAX, provides the fewest parking spaces with 125 stalls.

In the 2019 report, passengers originating from TriMet park and rides accounted for five percent of TriMet's total weekday ridership. In 2017, the Portland–Milwaukie segment had a 100-percent usage rate of its available spaces while the Westside MAX segment had 85 percent. The corridor with the lowest use of available parking spaces was the I-205 MAX at 30 percent; TriMet attributes this to factors such as inconvenient lot access and the Green Line's indirect route to downtown Portland compared with the availability of more direct bus routes. The cost-per-space for building park and rides is estimated at $18,000 per surface-lot space and $52,000 per structured space.

TriMet additionally offers four different bicycle parking options at its MAX stations, although not all options are available at every station. Bike and rides are secure, enclosed spaces that are accessible by keycard and are monitored 24 hours per day by security cameras;  they are available at eight stations. Electronic bicycle lockers, or eLockers, are secure lockers that may also be accessed by keycard and are made available on a first-come, first-served basis. TriMet contracts some keycard access to BikeLink and uses its Hop Fastpass on others. Other lockers may be rented by users. Bicycle racks are the most common form of bicycle parking.

Rolling stock

, TriMet operates five models of light rail vehicles designated as "Type 1" through "Type 5", of which two are successive upgrades of the same model. Downtown Portland's  downtown blocks allow the operation of only one or two consists to prevent stopped trains from blocking intersections. Type 2 and 3 low-floor vehicles may run singularly or coupled to another Type 1, 2, or 3 vehicle. Type 1 high-floor vehicles are also capable of running singularly, but doing so would constrain accessibility due to a lack of wheelchair access. Thus, a high-floor car must be coupled with a low-floor car. Type 4 and 5 cars can only be coupled to one another.

Twenty-six Type 1 high-floor vehicles were produced for the Banfield light rail project by a joint venture between Bombardier and La Brugeoise et Nivelles beginning in 1983. TriMet announced it would purchase seven additional vehicles that August, but a budget shortfall forced the agency to withdraw this proposal the following November. The cars are similar in design to Bombardier vehicles that had been used in Rio de Janeiro. Bombardier built the frames in Quebec but its factory in Barre, Vermont, manufactured the majority of each car, the first of which arrived in Portland in 1984. Each  car is single-articulated and contains six axles. The high floors connect with the low platforms through interior steps, which necessitated platform wheelchair lifts until the arrival of low-floor cars. A car sits 76 people and has an overall capacity of 166.

In 1992, TriMet officials conducted an accessibility study and determined that low-floor cars were the most cost-effective alternative to providing universal access. MAX then became the first light rail system in North America to acquire low-floor train sets when TriMet procured 39 model SD660 cars from Siemens in 1993. These Type 2 cars were equipped with doorway wheelchair ramps. They entered service during the partial opening of the Westside MAX in 1997. By 2000, TriMet had ordered 17 more Type 2 cars including six for the Airport MAX project. The system's 27 Type 3 vehicles, which the agency purchased as part of the Interstate MAX project and first brought into use in 2003, are the same model as the Type 2 vehicles but with technical upgrades and a new livery.

Twenty-two Siemens S70 low-floor cars, which were designated Type 4, were purchased in conjunction with the I-205 MAX and Portland Transit Mall projects, and were first used in 2009. Type 4 cars have a more streamlined design and more seating, and are lighter and more energy-efficient than the previous models. The Type 4 cars were the first in the MAX network to use LED-type destination signs. The second series of S70 cars, TriMet's Type 5 vehicles, were procured for the Portland–Milwaukie light rail project. TriMet placed an order for the Type 5 cars with Siemens in 2012 and delivery commenced in 2014. These vehicles include some improvements over the Type 4 cars, including less-cramped interior seating, and improvements to the air-conditioning system and wheelchair ramps. These introduced a new seating layout in the center section, among other changes, and Siemens later retroactively redesignated TriMet's Type 5 cars as model S700.

In July 2019, TriMet placed an order for 26 Siemens S700 light rail vehicles that are intended to replace the system's Type 1 vehicles. The first car was delivered in December 2022.

Maintenance

TriMet's vehicle-maintenance complexes for the MAX system are the Ruby Junction facility in Gresham and the smaller Elmonica facility in Beaverton. The Ruby Junction facility is located near Ruby Junction/East 197th Avenue station while the Elmonica facility is adjacent to Elmonica/Southwest 170th Avenue station; both are on the Blue Line.

Ruby Junction began with one building that TriMet built as part of the original MAX project in the early 1980s; it had expanded to three multi-story buildings totaling  occupying  by 2010, and to four buildings totalling  occupying  by 2016. It contains 13 maintenance bays and its yard tracks have the capacity to store 87 light rail cars. In 2016, around 200 employees worked at Ruby Junction and almost 200 MAX operators operated trains that were based there. In addition to vehicle maintenance, crews who maintain the MAX system's tracks and signals are also based at Ruby Junction. In 2015, some maintenance-of-way personnel moved into the Portland Vintage Trolley carbarn next to Rose Quarter Transit Center after Vintage Trolley service was discontinued.

Ruby Junction originally housed TriMet's operations, communications, and administrative workers.

The Elmonica facility was built as part of the Westside MAX Project in the mid-1990s and was completed in 1996. Its building has  of space.

Services

From Monday to Thursday, MAX trains run for 22 hours per day. Additional late-night trips are provided on Fridays. Except for additional late-night trips on Saturdays, weekend service runs on a slightly reduced schedule. TriMet designates all MAX lines as "Frequent Service" routes, which ensures service runs on a 15-minute headway for most of each day. During the early morning and late evening hours, trains operate with headways of up to 30minutes. During rush hours, headways can be as short as three minutes, particularly in the central section of the system where lines overlap. At many stations, a live display shows the destination and time-to-arrival of the next several trains using data gathered by a vehicle tracking system installed on the light rail tracks.

Ridership

MAX carried over 38.8million total passengers in 2019, an average of 120,900 riders per day on weekdays. This is slightly lower than the number of riders recorded in 2018 and represents the system's third consecutive year of fallen ridership. MAX ridership peaked in 2012, when the system recorded around 42.2million annual passengers. 2016 marks the last year ridership increased; this was due to the opening of the Orange Line. TriMet attributes falling ridership to perceived crime within trains and stations and lower-income riders being forced out of the inner city by rising housing prices. In 2019 (prior to the COVID-19 pandemic), MAX was the fourth-busiest light rail system in the United States after the light rail services of Metro Rail in Los Angeles, the MBTA in Boston, and Muni Metro in San Francisco.

Fares

As is standard practice on North American light rail systems, MAX uses proof-of-payment for fare collection and stations do not have ticket barriers. TriMet employs an automated fare collection system through a stored-value, contactless smart card called Hop Fastpass, which can be purchased from the TriMet ticket office at Pioneer Courthouse Square and participating retail outlets. Single-use Hop Fastpass tickets may be purchased from ticket vending machines at MAX stations, and a virtual card is available to smartphone users. Smartphones with a debit or credit card loaded into Google Pay, Samsung Pay, or Apple Pay and Portland Streetcar 2-hour tickets and one-day passes can also be used to board MAX. Riders must tap their fare medium onto a card reader with each boarding. Fares are flat rate and are capped according to use. The cost of fare for adults is $2.50 for a 2-hour ticket, $5 for a day pass, and $100 for a month pass. For youth and honored citizens, it is $1.25 for a 2-hour ticket, $2.50 for a day pass, and $28 for a month pass. Using Hop Fastpass, riders may transfer to other TriMet services, C-Tran, and the Portland Streetcar.

Discontinued services

From the MAX system's opening until 2012, riding trains within Fareless Square, which was known as the Free Rail Zone from 2010 to 2012, was free of charge. Fareless Square included all of downtown and, starting in 2001, part of the Lloyd District. The 37-year-old fare-free zone was discontinued on September 1, 2012, as part of system-wide cost-cutting measures. As part of the same budget cuts, TriMet discontinued its zonal fares and moved to a flat-fare system. Zones had been in place since 1986; higher fares were charged for longer journeys across four paid zones.

The MAX Mall Shuttle operated on weekday afternoons from when it was introduced on September 14, 2009, until 2011. It acted as a supplement to the light rail service provided on the Portland Transit Mall by the Green and Yellow lines. The Mall Shuttle operated between Union Station and Portland State University every 30 minutes from noon until 5:30p.m. TriMet discontinued this supplementary shuttle service on June 5, 2011. Along with bus services, the mall continues to be served by two MAX lines in each direction—Green and Yellow lines northbound and Green and Orange lines southbound—which provide a combined average headway of 7.5 minutes in each direction at most times.

The Portland Vintage Trolley operated on the MAX system on most weekends from 1991 until 2014, serving the same stops. This service used 1991-built replicas of 1904 Portland streetcars. Originally, the Vintage Trolley service followed a section of the original MAX line between the Library and Galleria stations and Lloyd Center. In September 2009, the service moved to the newly opened MAX alignment along the transit mall, running between Union Station to Portland State University, and remained on this route in subsequent seasons. In 2011, the service was reduced to seven or eight Sundays per year, and in July 2014 it was discontinued entirely and the two remaining faux-vintage cars were sold to a group planning a streetcar line in St. Louis.

Safety

TriMet employs a transit police division to patrol MAX and other TriMet property. Most of its officers serve with local law enforcement agencies and are assigned terms with the transit police; this partnership with local police enables the closest available unit to respond to incidents. TriMet also partners with the Transportation Security Administration, which provides a canine unit. Riders are encouraged to alert TriMet employees using on-board intercoms or to dial 9-1-1 upon witnessing a crime or suspicious activity. TriMet operates over 4,000 security cameras; all MAX trains and stations became fully equipped with cameras in 2014.

2017 stabbing incident

On May 26, 2017, at approximately 4:30pm, a man fatally stabbed two people and injured a third after he was confronted for shouting anti-Muslim slurs at two teenage girls inside a MAX train. Two men—a technician and U.S. Army veteran, and a recent university graduate—died from wounds to their necks while a third victim, who is also male, survived. The attacker, who described himself as a white nationalist, was arrested and charged with murder, attempted murder, and other crimes. On February 21, 2020, the perpetrator was found guilty on all charges, including two counts of first-degree murder.

This resulted in a mural being painted on the station entrance of the Hollywood Transit Center, where the stabbing occurred.

See also
List of rail transit systems in the United States
Transportation in Portland, Oregon

Notes

References

External links

 

 
1986 establishments in Oregon
750 V DC railway electrification
825 V DC railway electrification
Electric railways in Oregon
Light rail in Oregon
Passenger rail transportation in Oregon
Railway lines opened in 1986
Transportation in Hillsboro, Oregon
Transportation in Multnomah County, Oregon
Transportation in Washington County, Oregon
TriMet